Tara Janelle Llanes (born November 28, 1976 in West Covina, California United States) is a Bicycle Motocross (BMX) racer whose prime competitive years were from 1990-1993. She became a champion Mountain Bike (MTB) racer. She later played wheelchair tennis and wheelchair basketball for Canada. Her surname is pronounced "Yaw-ness" but for obvious reasons it is often mispronounced "lanes" as in the type of division of a pathway.

BMX racing career milestones

Note: Professional first are on the national level unless otherwise indicated.

Retired: Originally in 1995 to focus on Mountain Bike racing full time. She restarted in late 2006 with an eye toward making the 2008 Olympic Team. See "First professional race result". According to Llanes USA Cycling asked her tor restart her BMX career:

However, an apparent career-ending injury in MTB eliminated that possibility for 2008. She has however, stated her goal to be to return to racing competition.

*In the NBL Junior Women; No comparable level existed in the ABA.
**In the NBL it was/is Supergirls/Elite Women; in the ABA it is Pro Girls.

Career factory and major bike shop sponsors

Note: This listing only denotes the racer's primary sponsors. At any given time a racer could have numerous ever changing co-sponsors. Primary sponsorships can be verified by BMX press coverage and sponsor's advertisements at the time in question. When possible exact dates are used.

Amateur/Junior Women
Aussie Wear Early April 1989-December 1990
Haro Designs: December 1990-December 1991 The ABA Silverdollar nationals in Reno, Nevada held on January 12, 1991 was Llanes's first race for Haro/Crupi.
Haro/Crupi: December 1991-December 1994

Professional/Elite Women
Giant Bicycles/Pearl Izumi: 2006–Present

Career bicycle motocross titles

Note: Listed are District, State/Provincial/Department, Regional, National and International titles. Only sanctioning bodies that were active during the racer's career are listed.

Amateur/Junior Women
National Bicycle League (NBL)
1992 15 Girls Grandnational Champion
American Bicycle Association (ABA)
1989 12 Girls and 12 & Under Girls Cruiser National No.2
1990 California District 3 (CA-3) Girls No.1
1990 13 Girls Grand National Champion
1990 13 Girls National No.1
1991 and 1992 CA-3 Girls Cruiser No.1

BMX press magazine interviews and articles
"1990 District Number Ones" One of several profiles of the ABA's 1990 district number ones written in an autobiographical tense.

Mountain Bike Career Record
In 1993 while still racing BMX for Haro Bicycles, she asked that sponsor for a mountain bike and to go to a mountain bike race. She liked it and soon transitioned from BMX to MTB, with cross country Dual Slalom and after Dual Slalom was abolished by NORBA the 4-Cross Downhill events. During her mountain bike years she acquired the nickname of "T", the first letter of her given name. Unlike in BMX she turned pro in 1996. She almost immediately started doing well on the pro circuit but it was not until 1999 that she won her first title. In the now discontinued Dual Slalom down hill event of that year's ESPN Winter Extreme Games (also known Winter "X" Games), Tara took a Gold medal. She would go on to win a further 14 medals in the next seven years of her career including five championships. During this time she also suffered numerous injuries including punctured lungs and a broken foot. Then in September 2007, the most devastating of all; a crash that left her paralyzed from the waist down. She is in rigorous rehabilitation and despite physician's diagnosis of her never being able to walk again, she is determined to not only walk again, but to return to riding a bicycle and even competing. The last chapter of Llanes's racing career is probably not already written in the face of such determination.

Mountain Bike career milestones
Started racing: According to her website In 1993 at 16 years old. She asked the BMX team manager of Haro Designs who was sponsoring her repeatedly to try it and he finally relented. but in a May 2007 Mountain Bike Action interview it was Haro Bicycles that asked her to give it a try.

Sub Discipline(s): Down Hill, 4-Cross, Dual Slalom and Cross Country

First race result: According to Llanes's website. First in Junior Women in Dual Slalom at the Big Bear Lake, California. According to her Mountain Bike Action May 2000 interview it was a 2nd place in Junior Women in Dual Slalom at the 1993 NORBA Finals at Mammouth Mountain Resort in Mammoth Lakes, California.

Sanctioning body: National Off-Road Bicycle Association (NORBA)

Turned Professional: 1996

Retired: Her career has been on hold since her paralyzing injury suffered at the Jeep King of the Mountain finals event in Beaver Creek, Colorado on September 1, 2007. She is currently under intense physical rehabilitation with the intention of riding a bicycle again.

Career MTB factory and major Non-factory sponsors

Note: This listing only denotes the racer's primary sponsors. At any given time a racer could have numerous co-sponsors. Primary sponsorships can be verified by MTB press coverage and sponsor's advertisements at the time in question. When possible exact dates are given.

Amateur/Junior Women
Haro Bicycles: 1994-1996
Rotech: 1996-December 1997 She turned pro with this sponsor

Professional/Elite Women
Rotech: 1996-December 1997
Specialized: December 1997-December 2000
Yeti/Pearl Izumi: December 2000-October 2002 The Yeti/Pearl Izumi team was dissolved after the 2002 season.
Giant Bicycles/Pearl Izumi: December 2002–Present Despite her devastating injury Giant Bicycles renewed her contract and they will be working with her on her efforts to recover.

Career Mountain Bike Racing (MTB) titles

Amateur/Junior Women
National Off-Road Bicycle Association (NORBA)
1995 Junior National Downhill Champion
USA Cycling

Professional/Elite Women
ESPN Extreme (X) Games:
1999 Biker X Winter X Games Champion  (Gold Medal)
Union Cycliste Internationale (UCI)
1999 Bronze Medal Dual Slalom World Cup Champion
2000 Silver Medal Dual Slalom World Cup Champion
2001 Bronze Medal Dual Slalom World Cup Champion
2000 Dual Silver Medal World Champion
2001 Dual Bronze Medal World Champion
2001 4-Cross World Cup Champion
2004, 2005 4-Cross Bronze Medal World Champion
2004 4-Cross Silver Medal World Cup Champion
2006 4-Cross Bronze Medal World Cup Champion
National Off-Road Bicycle Association (NORBA)
2002 Dual Slalom National Champion
2002, 2004 U.S. National 4-Cross Champion
2006 National Downhill Champion
USA Cycling
2006 National Champion.

Significant MTB injuries

Broke Collar Bone in 1996 at Washington National.
Broke Collar Bone in the Downhill at the UCI World Cup Canmore, Alberta, Canada on the weekend of July 3–4, 1999. She came back only a few weeks after the accident, albeit she missed two World Cup events during her lay up.
She suffered two concussions in 2000.
She suffered numerous injuries  during a practice run at the NORBA mountain cross race on Chapman Hill in Durango, Colorado on August 3, 2002. She crashed on one of the very large double jumps. She suffered a broken left collarbone, three fractured ribs, two partially collapsed lungs one of which was severely bruised, a torn MCL in her right knee.
Suffered a broken left foot in an automobile accident on June 16, 2003 on a road in Pennsylvania. She was traveling in the Giant Team truck a Ford F350 which was towing the  team trailer on her way to Vermont for the third stop in the NORBA NCS series. Rescue had to cut Tara out of the vehicle. Three other occupants in the automobile Jared Rando and Dustin Adams had only minor scrapes. The team mechanic, Matt Duniho who was driving needed stitches. Llanes's foot got jammed under the seat in front of her breaking it. She went to the hospital to be treated and flew back to Southern California the next day while her teammates continued onto Vermont in the team's backup vehicle.  Llanes said of her injury:

2007 Spinal cord injury
On September 1, 2007, Llanes crashed at Beaver Creek, Colorado, host to the Jeep King of the Mountain Finale. The accident happened on the second to last straight down the Dual Slalom course as she raced head-to-head against Jill Kintner in the semifinals. Llanes hit an obstacle wrong and the bicycle landed nose first on the ground. She was thrown over the handlebars and onto her head and then landed on her back, suffering massive and severe lower back trauma, suffering a C-7 fracture and L-1 damage to her vertebrae, and paralyzing her lower extremities. She was first rushed to Vail Valley Medical Center and then was airlifted to Denver Health Hospital. She underwent seven hours of surgery but still had no feeling from the waist down. According to the surgeons who worked on her, the condition is most likely permanent. Llanes recalls the moment of the accident:

Llanes continues to undergo intensive rehabilitation and as of late 2008 she could move her left leg. Her stated goal is to get back into competitive racing again. As she stated in an interview with pedalpushersonline.com:

Wheelchair basketball 

Llanes took a new career selling adaptive mountain bikes, and began playing wheelchair tennis. She met Amanda Yan who suggested that she might try wheelchair basketball. Her friend, Richard Peter encouraged this, in the belief that it would improve her performance on the tennis court. She took up the sport in 2016, playing for the BC Royals and BC Breakers, and two years later was chosen as part of the Canadian national team for the 2018 Wheelchair Basketball World Championship in Hamburg, Germany.

See also
Motocross World Championship

Notes

External links
 The American Bicycle Association (ABA) website.
 The National Bicycle League (NBL) website.
 eastsidefreeride.com December 16, 2002 interview
 Giant Bicycles bio of Llanes compiled before her September 2007 accident.
 bikesutra.com 2003 interview
 July 12, 2007 interview: "Girl On: Tara Llanes".

1976 births
Living people
Sportspeople from West Covina, California
American female cyclists
BMX riders
Downhill mountain bikers
Four-cross mountain bikers
American mountain bikers
21st-century American women